Louis of Gramont (29 May 1689 – Battle of Fontenoy, 11 May 1745) was Duke of Gramont and a French general in the War of Austrian Succession.

Early life
He was the son of Marshal of France Antoine V de Gramont and Marie-Christine de Noailles (1672–1748), daughter of Marshal of France Anne-Jules, 2nd duc de Noailles.

Biography
He became Duke of Gramont after the death of his elder brother Antoine VI in 1741.

Louis of Gramont is best known for his role in the Battle of Dettingen, when his uncle Adrien-Maurice, 3rd duc de Noailles had manoeuvered the British and Austrians into a trap, exposed to the French artillery from the other side of the Main. Louis de Gramont was at the head of a blocking force of some 23,000 troops and was ordered to prevent an allied breakout. Instead he launched an all-out attack, which forced the French artillery to stop firing and with the attack spent and the French out of their defenses, the allies' counter-attack drove Gramont's force across and into the river, opening the road to Hanau and out of the trap.

He fought the allies again in the Battle of Fontenoy and was killed.

Personal life
On 11 March 1720 he married Geneviève de Gontaut  (1696–1756), daughter of Marshal of France Charles-Armand de Gontaut, duc de Biron (1663–1756), and had three children.

Sources
Web Genealogy
geneanet.org

Gramont,Louis of
Gramont,Louis of
Gramont,Louis of
Gramont,Louis of
Dukes of Gramont
18th-century peers of France